Routhgram (also spelled Rautgram) is a village in Manteswar CD block in Kalna subdivision of Purba Bardhaman district, West Bengal, India. It is adjacent to Kaigram

Demographics
As per the 2011 Census of India Rautgram had a total population of 3,506, of which 1,746 (50%) were males and 1,760 (50%) were females. Population below 6 years was 484. The total number of literates in Rautgram was 2,165 (71.64% of the population over 6 years).

Economy
The main market of the area, called Hattala is under this village. The bus stop of the locality is also under this village.

The main occupation is agriculture.

The STD code of the village is 0342.

Temples and festivals 
The village has temples to the deities Sarbamangala, Shiva, Durga,  Jagaddhatri, and Shani.

The major festival of the village is Sarbamangala Puja which takes place over several days in late winter, when visitors come to the village.

Sports
There is a football ground (Paldhirpar) at one end of the village.

Schools 
 Kaigram High School
 Routhgram D.D. Panja F.P. School
 Routhgram S.S.K.

References

Villages in Purba Bardhaman district